"Left of Center" is a song written by Suzanne Vega and Steve Addabbo which was released as part of the soundtrack to the 1986 film Pretty in Pink. It features Joe Jackson on piano. It was released as a single and reached No. 35 in Australia, No. 28 in Ireland and No. 32 in the United Kingdom.

References

1986 songs
1986 singles
Suzanne Vega songs
A&M Records singles